Upper Sorbian Gymnasium in Bautzen, is a coeducational gymnasium (e.g. preparatory high school or grammar school) in Saxony, Germany. The school is acting under the slogan "Develop Sorbian identity and cultivate humanistic traditions".

Notable alumni
 Stanislaw Tillich
 Bogna Koreng

See also
 Secondary education
 Lower Sorbian Gymnasium Cottbus

References

Secondary schools in Germany
Educational institutions established in 1947
Bilingual schools
1947 in Germany
Gymnasiums in Germany
Minority schools
Buildings and structures in Bautzen (district)
Sorbian culture